Rodinal is the trade name of a black and white developing agent produced originally by the German company Agfa based on the chemical 4-aminophenol. Rodinal is a popular high acutance black and white developer and is used at different dilutions for development in rotary machines, by agitation, as well as for stand development.

History 
Rodinal was patented on 27 January 1891, making it the oldest film developer which is still commercially available. Novel at the time of its invention was that it is delivered as a liquid concentrate and not as a powder.

During the division of Germany the original manufacturer Agfa was split, becoming the ORWO company in East Germany, where Rodinal was sold under the name ORWO R09.

After the insolvency of Agfa in 2004, production was taken over by the re-formed ADOX, which also purchased the trademark rights in the name in Europe (excluding France) and continues to sell the product under this name.

See also

 Film development

References

External links
 Ed Buffaloe's "Appreciating Rodinal" Article
 ADOX Rodinal
 An introduction to Rodinal
 Film developing with Rodinal
 Historic Rodinal Formulae
Photographic chemicals
Agfa